Hershenson is a surname. Notable people with this surname include:

Bruce Hershenson, American entrepreneur, publisher, and gamble
Mar Hershenson, American electrical engineer,  professor, and business executive in the electronic design automation industry and entrepreneur
Matt Hershenson, co-founder and managing director at Playground Global

See also
Gershenzon